Karen L. MacBeth (born September 23, 1967) is an American Republican politician who was a member of the Rhode Island House of Representatives representing District 52 from January 2009 to January 2017. Initially a Democrat, MacBeth left the party in 2016.

Education
MacBeth earned her BS in special education from Rhode Island College and her MA in administration from Providence College.

Elections
2012 – MacBeth was challenged in the September 11, 2012 Democratic Primary, winning with 1,076 votes (59.9%) and was unopposed for the November 6, 2012 General election, winning with 5,593 votes.
2010 – MacBeth was challenged in the September 23, 2010 Democratic Primary, winning with 1,458 votes (62.9%) and was unopposed for the November 2, 2010 General election, winning with 5,208 votes.
2008 – When District 52 Republican Representative Richard Singleton left the Legislature and left the seat open, MacBeth ran in the three-way September 9, 2008 Democratic Primary, winning with 1,614 votes (55.0%) and won the November 4, 2008 General election with 5,214 votes (63.9%) against Republican nominee Michael Tusoni.

References

External links
Official page at the Rhode Island General Assembly

Karen MacBeth at Ballotpedia
Karen L. MacBeth at the National Institute on Money in State Politics

Place of birth missing (living people)
1967 births
Living people
Members of the Rhode Island House of Representatives
People from Cumberland, Rhode Island
Providence College alumni
Rhode Island College alumni
Rhode Island Democrats
Women state legislators in Rhode Island
Rhode Island Republicans
21st-century American politicians
21st-century American women politicians